The Kisber Felver (which means half-bred from Kisbér) is a rare sport horse breed developed at the former Kisber Stud in Hungary. The Kisber Felver is not widely known, but has merit in sport horse disciplines. Only a handful of people continue breeding Kisber Felver horses today.

History

The Kisber Stud was founded in 1853, and initially bred Thoroughbreds. It successfully produced racehorses and was the origin for champions such as the unbeaten mare Kincsem, who was entered in The Guinness Book of World Records.

Through a carefully controlled breeding program, a distinct horse type evolved. The Kisber Felver was bred by crossing Thoroughbreds with Furiosos, Trakehners, Arabians, Anglo-Arabians, and Selle Français, while maintaining the a high ratio of Thoroughbred blood.

The Kisber Felver is a relatively young breed, developed over the past hundred years, and they display good conformation, athletic ability, movement, and a lively temperament. Like many other horse breeds, the Kisber Felver was endangered during the World War I and World War II. In 1945, more than half of the breeding stock were taken as war spoils. 150 Kisber Felver horses were imported for the US Remount, but were sold at public auction in 1947 when the remount disbanded. Unlike other European imports such as the Lipizzaner, the imported Kisber Felvers were widely crossbred, reducing the count of purebred animals. In 1961, the Dalmand Stud took hold of the remaining purebred Kisber Felvers. The stud has continued the breeding to the day.

Characteristics
Kisber Felvers are a sporthorse breed developed to perform in a variety of modern sport horse disciplines. All stallions intended for breeding must be inspected and licensed by the breeding committee.

External links
 Oklahoma State University page

Horse breeds
Horse breeds originating in Hungary